Unimagine is the second album by Australian post-hardcore band Hands Like Houses, released on 23 July 2013 on Rise Records.

Throughout their UK tour with Pierce the Veil and Woe, Is Me, the band started playing a new song mid-set. On 6 June 2013, the band announced via their Facebook account that their second album, titled Unimagine, was to be released on 23 July 2013 via Rise Records, and that the album's first single, "Introduced Species", would be released 12 June 2013.
On 12 June 2013, the band released the song and put up pre-order bundles for the album.

On 27 June 2013, the single entitled "A Fire On A Hill" was released.

Track listing
All tracks written and performed by Hands Like Houses except "Developments", "Weight", "The House You Built", "Fountainhead", "Wisteria" and "A Fire On A Hill" written by Hands Like Houses and Erik Ron.

Personnel
Hands Like Houses
Trenton Woodley – lead vocals
Matt "Coops" Cooper – lead guitar
Alex Pearson – rhythm guitar, backing vocals
Joel Tyrrell – bass guitar, backing vocals
Jamal Sabet – keyboards
Matt Parkitny – drums, percussion

Additional personnel & production
James Paul Wisner – produced, engineering and mixed. Additional guitar on 'Oceandust' 
Andy Van Dette – mastered
Glenn Thomas – artwork & design

References

2013 albums
Hands Like Houses albums
Rise Records albums
Albums produced by James Paul Wisner